Combat (French for fight) is a purposeful violent conflict meant to physically harm or kill the opposition. Combat may be armed (using weapons) or unarmed (not using weapons). Combat is sometimes resorted to as a method of self-defense, or can be used as a tool to impose one's will on others. An instance of combat can be a stand-alone confrontation or a small part of a much larger violent conflict. Instances of combat may also be benign and recreational, as in the cases of combat sports and mock combat.

Combat may comply with, or be in violation of local or international laws regarding conflict. Examples of rules include the Geneva Conventions (covering the treatment of people in war), medieval chivalry, the Marquess of Queensberry rules (covering boxing) and several forms of combat sports.

Hand-to-hand combat 

Hand-to-hand combat (melee) is combat at very close range, attacking the opponent with the body (striking, kicking, strangling, etc.) and/or with a melee weapon (knives, swords, batons, etc.), as opposed to a ranged weapon.

Hand-to-hand combat can be further divided into three sections depending on the distance and positioning of the combatants:
 Clinch fighting
 Ground fighting
 Stand-up fighting

Military combat 

Military combat has always been between two or more opposing military forces in warfare. Military combat situations can involve multiple groups, involving guerilla groups, insurgents, domestic and/or foreign governments. A military conflict is known either as a battle or a war, depending on the size of the fighting and exactly which geographical areas in which the war/battle occurs. Combat effectiveness has always demanded that the personnel maintain strategic preparedness by being sufficiently trained, armed, equipped, and funded to carry out combat operations in the unit to which they are assigned. Warfare falls under the laws of war, which govern its purposes and conduct, and protect the rights of combatants and non-combatants.

References

Sources
 Martin van Creveld: The Changing Face of War: Lessons of Combat, from the Marne to Turkey. Maine, New England 2007.

Further reading 
Wong, Leonard. 2006. "Combat Motivation in Today's Soldiers: U.S. Army War College Strategic Studies Institute."Armed Forces & Society, vol. 32: pp. 659–663. 
Gifford, Brian. 2005. "Combat Casualties and Race: What Can We Learn from the 2003-2004 Iraq Conflict?" Armed Forces & Society, vol. 31: pp. 201–225. 
Herspring, Dale. 2006. "Undermining Combat Readiness in the Russian Military, 1992-2005." Armed Forces & Society, Jul 2006; vol. 32: pp. 513–531. 
Ben-Shalom, Uzi; Lehrer, Zeev; and Ben-Ari, Eyal. 2005. "Cohesion during Military Operations: A Field Study on Combat Units in the Al-Aqsa Intifada." Armed Forces & Society, vol. 32: pp. 63–79. 
Woodruff, Todd; Kelty, Ryan; Segal, Archie Cooper, David R. 2006. "Propensity to Serve and Motivation to Enlist among American Combat Soldiers." Armed Forces & Society, Apr 2006; vol. 32: pp. 353–366. 
Dienstfrey, Stephen. 1988. "Women Veterans' Exposure to Combat." Armed forces & Society, vol. 14: pp. 549–558.

 
Military operations by type